Roussalka may refer to

Rusalka, Bulgaria, also called Roussalka
MY Roussalka, a luxury yacht in operation from 1931 to 1933
Roussalka (horse), a British Thoroughbred racehorse

See also
Rusalka (disambiguation)